Blood Quantum is a 2019 Canadian horror film written, directed, and edited by Jeff Barnaby and starring Michael Greyeyes, Elle-Máijá Tailfeathers, Forrest Goodluck, Kiowa Gordon, Brandon Oakes, Olivia Scriven, Kawennáhere Devery Jacobs, and Gary Farmer. The film depicts the effects of a zombie uprising on a First Nations reserve whose residents are immune to contracting the plague because of their indigenous heritage, but must still cope with the consequences of its effects on the world around them, including white refugees seeking shelter on the reserve.

Blood Quantum premiered at the 2019 Toronto International Film Festival, where it was named second runner-up for the People's Choice Award: Midnight Madness. The film was made available for streaming on Shudder in the United States, the United Kingdom, and Ireland on April 28, 2020, and has received generally positive reviews from critics, receiving the most nominations of any film at the 9th Canadian Screen Awards with 10 nominations, ultimately winning seven.

Plot
In 1981, on the Red Crow Indian Reservation in Quebec, Canada, fisherman Gisigu catches a number of salmon, and observes that they continue to move after being gutted. Elsewhere that morning, Gisigu's son, indigenous sheriff Traylor, responds to a call about a dying dog that belongs to his ex-wife, nurse Joss. Traylor euthanizes the dog by gunshot. He goes to visit Joss, and learns that their son Joseph has been arrested for vandalism in nearby Hollarbaster and is in jail with his half-brother Lysol. Traylor then visits Gisigu, who shows him the gutted yet moving salmon. Joss's dead dog reanimates in the trunk of Traylor's police car, and Traylor shoots it. Gisigu and Traylor set the dog and the fish on fire.

Traylor and Joss head into town to free Joseph from jail. Traylor, Joseph, Lysol, and police officer Shamu encounter an ill, violent man in the jail who bites Joseph on the arm. Joseph goes to a hospital, where his white, pregnant girlfriend Charlie is waiting. That night, Traylor responds to a call from an indigenous man named Shooker. Traylor enters Shooker's house and is attacked and bitten by Shooker's white girlfriend, whom Traylor beats with the butt of a shotgun. Traylor and Shooker head to a bridge where Joss, Joseph and Charlie have found themselves after having escaped the hospital in an ambulance.

Six months later, the outbreak of flesh-eating "zeds" has become widespread, and the Red Crow Reservation has been turned into a fortified compound. Its residents have learned that indigenous people cannot be infected by the "zed" plague, though white people can. Lysol has become increasingly aggressive towards Joseph and others' tendency to bring outsiders—such as a man and his young daughter, the latter of whom was bitten by an infected person, as well as a girl named Lilith, who hides the fact that she has also been infected—to the compound.

That night, at Lysol's shelter away from the compound, Joseph finds a now-zombified Lilith chewing on Lysol's phallus as he is crying on the floor from the pain. Joseph, Lysol and Moon then drive back to the compound with Lilith in restraints. Believing that the policy of letting in white survivors led to his disfigurement, Lysol snaps, stabbing Joseph with a knife, and lets Lilith loose inside the compound. Traylor and Gisigu, who went on a mission to eliminate zombies at a gas station with fellow tribesmen Bumper and Shooker, return to the compound to find it overrun with zombies. They learn that Joss, Joseph, Charlie, and eight other survivors are trapped in the basement of the compound. In the process of rescuing them, Shooker is able to drive away some of the survivors but Traylor is eaten alive by zombies to allow his family escape as they weren't able to get in the car in time.

Joss, Joseph and Charlie escape with Gisigu and Bumper. While Gisigu and Joseph enter a church to stop two associates of Lysol from murdering a group of survivors, Lysol finds Joss, Charlie and Bumper. Lysol backstabs Bumper heavily wounding him, and Joss shoots Lysol, but not before Lysol is able to unleash a zombie from the trunk of a car. The zombie bites Charlie, and Joseph arrives and kills the zombie. Joseph and Gisigu lead a wounded Lysol away from the scene, and Joseph stabs Lysol. Gisigu lets off a gunshot into the air, alerting zombies to the location where Lysol is; the zombies proceed to eat Lysol alive.

They think all hope is lost as the one remaining boat able to allow their escape is burning. Shooker with someone else comes back for them with two boats and takes Bumper with him while Joseph, Charlie and Joss set out into a large body of water with the other boat. Gisigu, armed with a sword, stays behind on land to fight off the zombies, and seems to survive standing with the last zombie's head in his hand. On the boat, Charlie gives birth to a baby girl. Charlie, feeling she is about to succumb to her bite wound, asks Joseph to kill her before she transforms into a zombie, and he mournfully shoots her in the head. The survivors boat continues to drift in the water, their fate unknown.

Cast

Production
Blood Quantum was filmed in 2018, primarily at the Kahnawake and Listuguj reserves in Quebec. Additional footage was shot in the city of Campbellton, New Brunswick.

The film's title refers to blood quantum laws, which have been used in the United States and Canada to determine indigeneity based on the percentage of one's indigenous ancestry. Barnaby has described the film as offering commentary on colonialism.

The film is set in 1981 because that was the year in which a force of game wardens, fisheries officers and Quebec Provincial Police officers raided Listuguj, arresting and beating many of its members and confiscating their fishing equipment. Those members who were not incarcerated erected barricades, and in retaliation the aforementioned authorities conducted a second raid. In addition to zombie films, the film was also influenced by Incident at Restigouche, Alanis Obomsawin's influential 1984 documentary film about the Listuguj raids, which Barnaby had all of the actors watch before commencing production.

Release
Blood Quantum was brought to the Cannes Film Market in May 2019 as part of "Fantastic 7", a program of genre films sponsored by various international film festivals, where it was sponsored by the Toronto International Film Festival. Its public world premiere took place at the 2019 Toronto International Film Festival, where it was named second runner-up for the People's Choice Award: Midnight Madness.

The film was acquired for international distribution on the Shudder streaming service in 2019, with Canadian streaming rights to be held by Crave. The film was made available for streaming on Shudder in the United States, the United Kingdom and Ireland on April 28, 2020.

Reception
The website's critics consensus reads: "Blood Quantum blends bloody horror with sociopolitical subtext, taking a fresh bite out of the crowded zombie genre in the bargain." On Metacritic, the film has a weighted average score of 63 out of 100 based on 11 critics, indicating "generally favorable reviews".

Elisabeth Vincentelli of The New York Times gave the film a mostly positive review, writing that its "central premise is inspired: When dead people come back to ersatz life, it turns out that Indigenous folks are immune — a sardonic twist on their ancestors succumbing to diseases imported by the European settlers." Matthew Monagle of The Austin Chronicle gave the film a score of three-and-a-half stars out of five, and wrote that it "rejects the default white gaze of so many horror films, choosing to tell a story through an unapologetically Indigenous lens." Joe Lipsett of Bloody Disgusting wrote that "Blood Quantum serves both as a reasonably entertaining zombie film, but more importantly, as a vital socio-political critique of real historical events in Canada." Shea Vassar, a Cherokee Nation staff writer of Film Daze, wrote that "Barnaby is ushering in a new era of Indigenous filmmaking. While still addressing some of the post-colonial pain that exists within communities today, Blood Quantum is a refreshing break from the same sad drama that is usually regurgitated when filmmakers, even those from an Indigenous or Native background, attempt to talk about the Indian experience."

The Guardians Benjamin Lee gave the film three out of five stars, writing that it is "best taken as a violent slab of late-night exploitation, made notable by a powerful conceit and some evocative visuals. It's just a shame that the execution can't quite catch up with the premise." Brian Tallerico of RogerEbert.com gave the film two-and-a-half out of four stars, commending its action and social commentary but criticizing its "poor performances and awkward dialogue". David Ehrlich of IndieWire gave the film a grade of "C+", writing: "The filmmaking in Blood Quantum is seldom as compelling as its premise, and it's frustrating to watch such a fresh take on the zombie genre be mired in several of its most rotten tropes. [...] But when it works it works".

Awards

References

External links
 
 
 Blood Quantum at Library and Archives Canada

2019 films
Canadian zombie films
English-language Canadian films
Mi'kmaq-language films
Films directed by Jeff Barnaby
Films shot in Quebec
Films shot in New Brunswick
2019 horror films
2010s Canadian films
Canadian horror films